(Thomas) Martin Embley  is a professor at Newcastle University who has made contributions to our understanding of the origin of eukaryotes and the evolution of organelles such as mitochondria, mitosomes and hydrogenosomes, that are found in parasitic protists.

In May 2021, Embley  was appointed as a Fellow of the Royal Society.

Education
Embley was educated at Newcastle University, where he was awarded a PhD on the biology of the bacterium Renibacterium salmoninarum in 1983.

References

Fellows of the Royal Society
Fellows of the Academy of Medical Sciences (United Kingdom)
Members of the European Molecular Biology Organization
Living people
Year of birth missing (living people)